Euglandina turris is a species of predatory air-breathing land snail, a terrestrial pulmonate gastropod mollusk in the family Spiraxidae.

Subspecies 
 Euglandina turris longurio Pilsbry & Cockerell, 1926

References

Spiraxidae
Gastropods described in 1846